Matt Farrow (born 28 October 1991), known as "Farrow", is an English electronic dance music record producer and DJ from Leeds, UK. He has gained support from BBC Radio 1, and played Bestival in Isle of Wight in 2014.

Discography

Singles

Remixes

References

1991 births
English DJs
English record producers
Living people